The President of the Organizing Committee for the Olympic Games is the individual who is in charge of leading the Organizing Committee for each Olympic Games. During the opening and closing ceremonies, the president does a speech before the IOC president.

Lists of presidents

Summer Olympic Games

Winter Olympic Games

Summer Youth Olympic Games

Winter Youth Olympic Games

Other offices held

Presidents of the Olympic Organizing Committee have gone on to or have served in other high offices.

Joseph Goebbels who headed the organizing committees for the 1936 Winter Olympics and 1936 Summer Olympics served as Chancellor of Germany for one day in 1945 before committing suicide. 

Konstantin Chernenko was the leader of the Soviet Union while also being the President of the OCOG.

Elected office
David R. Francis who headed the organizing committee for the 1904 Summer Olympics served as Governor of Missouri prior to heading the organizing committee. He later briefly served as the United States Ambassador to Russia. 

Following the 2002 Winter Olympics in Salt Lake City, Mitt Romney ran for Governor of Massachusetts and was elected Governor with nearly 50% of the vote in the election. He served one term as governor. He was the Republican nominee for President of the United States in the 2012 Presidential Election but lost to then-incumbent President Barack Obama. Sixteen years after the Winter Olympics, Romney would go on be to elected Senator for the state of Utah following the midterm election.

Yoshirō Mori who headed of the organizing committee for the 2020 Summer Olympics in Tokyo until 2021, he served as Prime Minister of Japan from 2000 to 2001.

Other sporting positions
Pierre de Coubertin who headed the organizing committees for the 1900 and 1924 Summer Olympics as well as the 1924 Winter Olympics was the founder of the modern Olympic movement and International Olympic Committee. He served as President of the International Olympic Committee from 1896 to 1925.

Peter Ueberroth who headed the organizing committee for the 1984 Summer Olympics in Los Angeles went on to serve as the Commissioner of Baseball from 1984 to 1989.

Sebastian Coe who headed the organizing committee for the 2012 Summer Olympics in London is now serving as the President of the International Association of Athletics Federations. He had also served as the Chairman of the British Olympic Association from 2012 to 2016.

Notes

References

External links
 ORGANISING COMMITTEES FOR THE OLYMPIC GAMES